Rita Ryack is a costume designer who was nominated for an Academy Award for Best Costume Design at the 73rd Academy Awards for her work in How the Grinch Stole Christmas. She was also nominated for a Tony Award at the 37th Tony Awards for My One and Only, and was nominated for the award again in 2014, for Casa Valentina. She received a further nomination at the 62nd Primetime Emmy Awards for the film You Don't Know Jack.

Career 
Rita Ryack was born in Houston, Texas. She received her BFA from Brandeis University in Waltham, Massachusetts and later her MFA from Yale School of Drama. She began her work in the entertainment induesty as a cartoon animator for Lisberger Studios in Boston.

Her first design job for the Broadway musical My One and Only, for which she earned her first Tony nomination. Throughout the years she has done costume design for a wide range of productions such as films like Hairspray, Casino, and Apollo 13, many on and off Broadway theater productions, as well as the music video for Bad by Michael Jackson.

Notable she has, many times, worked with Martin Scorsese, Ron Howard, and Robert De Niro.

While designing for productions such as the Broadway play Casa Valentina she references old advertisements, photographs, and films for inspiration.

Selected works

References

External links 
 

Living people
Year of birth missing (living people)
American costume designers
Women costume designers